Akif Pirinçci (born 20 October 1959) is a Turkish-born German writer who is best known internationally for his novel Felidae.

Biography 
Pirinçci was born on 20 October 1959 in Istanbul, Turkey, but emigrated to Germany together with his parents in 1969. He began to write fiction at a young age, and published his first novel Tränen sind immer das Ende ("tears are always the end") in 1980, at the age of 21. His next literary work, published in 1989, was the novel Felidae, a work of crime fiction with cats as the main protagonists. The novel has been translated into 17 languages and became an international bestseller.

Due to the success of the novel, Pirinçci expanded his concept of "cat crime fiction" and published several sequels to Felidae, out of which Felidae II and Felidae V (Salve Roma!) have been translated into English. An animated movie based on Felidae, the script of which had been co-written by Pirinçci, was produced in Germany in 1994, and was also dubbed in English.

Pirinçci has published several other novels which were not set in the fictional world of the Felidae series – however, none of those works have reached such a high degree of popularity. Lately, however, he had some success with the thriller "The Back Door", which was adapted for the screen in Germany, with Mads Mikkelsen in the leading role. "The Back Door" is the only standalone novel of Pirinçci's that has been translated into English.

Pirinçci currently lives in Bonn in Germany.

Controversies

Political essays 

Pirinçci published non-fiction essays in 2012 on Facebook, and in right-wing newspapers such as Junge Freiheit, eigentümlich frei, and Sezession.

Pirinçci's essays were collected in the two books Deutschland von Sinnen - Der irre Kult um Frauen, Homosexuelle und Zuwanderer (2014, "Germany Gone Mad: The Crazy Cult Around Women, Homosexuals, and Immigrants"), which soon became a bestseller, and Die große Verschwulung – Wenn aus Männern Frauen werden und aus Frauen keine Männer (2015, "The Big Gayification: When men become women and women won't become men"), both published by the retail company Manufactum, as part of Edition Sonderweg edited by André F. Lichtschlag, the publisher and editor-in-chief of eigentümlich frei and a writer for Junge Freiheit. His statements on feminism and opposition to immigration have provoked controversy in Germany and throughout Europe.

Relationship with right-wing organisations 

While writing and publishing these non-fiction essays, Pirinçci also increasingly came in contact with functionaries of the anti-Islamic movement Pegida, the right-wing populist party Alternative for Germany, and the small right-wing German Freedom Party, who organized lecture tours where Pirinçci would read from his two political essay books. When he faced criticism in May 2014, he justified these contacts by telling the online blog of the newspaper Die Zeit "I don't give a flying fuck if people call me a Nazi, I don't give a damn." ("Es geht mir am Arsch vorbei, wenn man mich einen Nazi nennt, das ist mir scheißegal").

Defamation suit 

On 20 January 2015, the local paper General-Anzeiger reported that Pirinçci had been found liable for defamation in a civil suit brought by a professor of sociology and biology, whom Pirinçci had described as a "mentally sick, manic queer with a screw loose" ("geisteskranken, durchgeknallten Schwulen mit Dachschaden"). Pirinçci had also described the professor's theories as a "jewel of stupidity" ("Juwel der Doofheit").

19 October 2015 Pegida speech 

At the first anniversary of the Pegida protests in Dresden on 19 October 2015, Pirinçci was invited as keynote speaker. He accused German politicians of being "Gauleiter against their own people" and called Germany's government a "shit state" ("Scheißstaat"). Further, according to Pirinçci, Muslims want to "pump infidels full of their Muslim juice" ("Ungläubige mit ihrem Moslemsaft vollpumpen") and stated that Germany is becoming a "Muslim garbage dump" ("Moslemmüllhalde"). He called the German Green Party a "Party of child fuckers" ("Kinderfickerpartei"), and the spokesperson for the mosque in Erfurt a "Muslim guy with a Taliban beard" ("Moslemfritzen mit Talibanbart"), who had as much to do with German culture as "my asshole with the production of perfume" ("wie mein Arschloch mit Parfümherstellung").

However, the most-widely spread quote from Pirinçci's 19 October speech was, "Unfortunately, the concentration camps are out of order at the moment!" ("Aber die KZs sind ja leider derzeit außer Betrieb!"), which was met with applause from the crowd. In a wider context, Pirinçci's concentration camps statement was intended to accuse critics of Pegida of intending to send Pegida members to said concentration camps. Pirinçci's remarks were apparently deemed too offensive by the crowd, and was booed off the stage.

Within 24 hours after first quotes from Pirinçci's Pegida speech appeared in the media, his publishers Goldmann and Random House issued statements that they had cancelled their contracts with Pirinçci and would no longer sell any of his books, and the webmaster to his online blog also cancelled Pirinçci's contract. At the same time, Amazon Germany chose to de-list his books so they can't be found through searches or ordered through the website. A few days later, all relevant book wholesalers in Germany (Libri, Umbreit, and KNV) also stopped ordering his books, and many independent bookstores issued statements that they would refuse to order his books, even upon request. This reaction by bookstores was criticized by columnist Jan Fleischhauer in Der Spiegel as amounting to authoritarian censorship. Volker Beck, member of parliament for the German Green Party, filed charges against Pirinçci for public incitement to commit criminal acts and incitement to hatred. A spokesperson for the federal prosecutor's office confirmed that an investigation is ongoing.

Two weeks after his Pegida speech, Pirinçci told Der Spiegel that the boycott of all his books overnight (except for the two political essay collections at Manufactum) as well as his public notoriety resulting from the affair made him seriously consider emigration.

List of literary works 
 Tränen sind immer das Ende (1980)
 Der Rumpf (literally meaning "the torso") (1992)
 Yin (1997)
 The Back Door (German: Die Damalstür) (2001)
 Der letzte Weltuntergang: Krimi-Erzählungen ("The Final Apocalypse") (2007)
 Volltreffer (2011), written under the pseudonym Cedric Arnold

Felidae 
 Felidae (German: Felidae) (1989)
 Felidae II aka Felidae on the Road (German: Francis. Felidae II) (1993)
 Cave Canem (1999)
 Das Duell ("the duel") (2002)
 Salve Roma! (2004)
 Schandtat (2007)
 Felipolis (2010)
 Göttergleich (2014)
Felidae animated movie (script) (1994)

List of non-fiction works 
 Cat Sense (2011)
 Deutschland von Sinnen: Der irre Kult um Frauen, Homosexuelle und Zuwanderer (2014) (Germany Gone Mad: The Crazy Cult around Women, Homosexuals and Immigrants)

Further reading

References

External links
Akif Pirinçci's Official Web Site 
Akif Pirinçci's Old Web Site (no longer operating as per 20 October 2015)
 Akif Pirinçci in: NRW Literatur im Netz 

1959 births
Writers from Bonn
Turkish emigrants to West Germany
German crime fiction writers
German fantasy writers
German screenwriters
German male screenwriters
Living people
German male novelists
German critics of Islam
Anti-immigration politics in Germany
Counter-jihad activists
Former Muslim critics of Islam
German former Muslims
Male critics of feminism
People from Mayen-Koblenz
Writers from Istanbul